Qmusic may refer to:

 Qmusic (Belgium), commercial radio station of the Medialaan group in Flanders since 12 November 2001
 Qmusic (Netherlands), commercial radio station in the Netherlands since 31 August 2005
 Qmusic Limburg, regional commercial radio station in the Dutch province of Limburg since 1 June 2014